"I Do" is a song released in 1999 by the American vocal trio, Blaque. It was released as the group's second single in the United States and Japan, and the third single in Europe.

Background and composition 
Originally, "I Do" was planned to be the second official single for Blaque in the United States since early in their debut album's roll out. However, because of the demand and success on Rhythmic radio that "Bring It All to Me" had in comparison, its promotion was postponed to 2000.

Musically, it is a mid-tempo pop song with a "funked" up-style production similar to the Spice Girls.  It has an "Instant hook, highly accessible melody and youthful vocals". The songs structure have typical R&B/hip hop based verses, while its chorus has a 1960's styled hook "filled with shoo-bop shoo-bop" ad libs reminiscent of The Supremes. The chorus also includes other sounds such as clapping in the background. In addition the song has a tempo of 128 beats per minutes in the key of C major.
 
In early 2000, the song was reworked and remixed by Trackmasters and sent to U.S. urban radio. The song's remix is a street-edged dance track with a funky bassline. It also features a sample of "I'll Do 4 U" by Father MC. This remix is one of the three remixes the duo produced for the group.

Music video 
The video for "I Do" was directed by Bille Woodruff, who later collaborated with them again on their next single "Bring It All To Me". The video starts with a cartoon portrait of Blaque on a television before switching over to the members singing the verses in a colorful set wearing white outfits with silver accents. The music video uses a lot of ripple and glitch special effects to emulate flipping through channels on a television. During the chorus the ladies are dressed head to toe in hot pink while performing choreography in a futuristic fuchsia set with male background dancers. They switch over to a purple set, where they are dressed in purple velvet and fur pieces in front of large doors with the same cartoon portraits of the group. This setting is where there are shots of the group being watched from a futuristic tablet. During Natina's verse, she is wearing a karate uniform and handling nunchucks while being trained by Lisa "Left Eye" Lopes before fighting Lopes during the latter's verse. Towards the end of the video, Blaque make a reference to The Matrix when they jump up in the air utilizing bullet time editing.

The music video made its debut on BET the week ending August 15, 1999, and a week later on The Box. It was resent to both stations months later on the weeks ending March 5, and March 12, 2000. The video made it its debut on MTV on the week ending April 3, 2000.

When the late singer Aaliyah hosted TRL in 2000, she mentioned that the video was "adorable" and that she loved the pink outfits they wore.

Although the song didn't perform as well as the other album's singles, the video for "I Do"  gave Blaque their first and only MTV Video Music Awards nomination in 2000 for Best Editing in a Video.

Track listings 
Japanese maxi-CD single
 "I Do" (Album Version) – 	3:28
 "I Do" Featuring – Lisa "Left Eye" Lopes – 3:50
 "I Do (Without Rap) – 3:13
 "I Do" (Instrumental) – 3:47
 "I Do" (R&B Mix With Rap) – 3:57

US promo maxi-CD single, European promo maxi-CD single
 "I Do" (Track Masters Mix) – 	3:49
 "I Do" (Track Masters Precisions Mix) – 3:23
 "I Do" (R&B Mix With Rap) – 3:57
 "I Do" (R&B Mix Without Rap) – 3:56
 "I Do" Featuring – Lisa "Left Eye" Lopes – 3:49

UK promo 12" vinyl
 "I Do" (Track Masters/Precisions Mix) – 3:23
 "I Do" (R&B Mix With Rap) – 3:57
 "I Do" (Album Version) – 	3:25
 "I Do" Featuring – Lisa "Left Eye" Lopes – 3:49
 "I Do" (Track Masters Mix) – 	3:49

US promo maxi-CD single
 "I Do"  (Edit Without Rap) – 3:11
 "I Do" (Album Version) – 3:25
 "I Do" Featuring – Lisa "Left Eye" Lopes – 3:49

European CD single
 "I Do" (Album Version) – 	3:27
 "I Do" (Track Masters Remix - 2000) – 3:28

US promo CD single
 "I Do" (Album Version) – 	3:25
 "I Do" (Track Masters Remix 2000)	– 3:29
 "I Do" (Track Masters Remix 2000 W/o Rap) – 2:50

Australian enhanced CD single
 "I Do" (Album Version) – 	3:25
 "I Do" (Track Masters Remix 2000 W/o Rap) – 2:50
 "I Do" (Track Masters Remix 2000)	– 3:29
 "I Do" (Track Masters/Precision Mix) – 3:23
 "I Do" Featuring Lisa "Left Eye" Lopes – 3:49
 "I Do" (R&B Mix With Rap)	– 3:58
 "808" (music video)
 "I Do" (music video)

Charts

Release history

References 

1998 songs
1999 singles
Blaque songs
Lisa Lopes songs
Music videos directed by Bille Woodruff
Columbia Records singles